Bermuda competed at the 1996 Summer Olympics in Atlanta, United States.

Athletics

Men
Track & road events

Field events

Cycling

Road

Equestrian

Dressage

Sailing

Women

Open

See also
Bermuda at the 1995 Pan American Games

References
Official Olympic Reports
sports-reference

Nations at the 1996 Summer Olympics
1996 Summer Olympics
Olymp